HMAS Katoomba (J204/M204), named after the tourist resort of Katoomba, New South Wales, was one of 60 Bathurst-class corvettes constructed during World War II, and one of 36 initially manned and commissioned solely by the Royal Australian Navy (RAN).

Design and construction

In 1938, the Australian Commonwealth Naval Board (ACNB) identified the need for a general purpose 'local defence vessel' capable of both anti-submarine and mine-warfare duties, while easy to construct and operate. Construction of the prototype  did not go ahead, but the plans were retained. The need for locally built 'all-rounder' vessels at the start of World War II saw the "Australian Minesweepers" (designated as such to hide their anti-submarine capability, but popularly referred to as "corvettes") approved in September 1939, with 60 constructed during the course of the war: 36 (including Katoomba) ordered by the RAN, 20 ordered by the British Admiralty but manned and commissioned as RAN vessels, and 4 for the Royal Indian Navy.

Katoomba was laid down by Poole & Steel at Balmain, New South Wales on 9 September 1940. She was launched on 16 April 1941 by Mrs. Lloyd, then deputy mayoress of Katoomba, and was commissioned into the RAN on 17 December 1941.

Operational history
Katoomba entered active service with an assignment to Darwin, where she arrived on 19 December 1941. The next day, Katoomba, along with sister ships Deloraine and Lithgow, and the United States destroyer Edsall, was involved in the prosecution and successful sinking of Japanese submarine I-124, the first enemy submarine sunk in Australian waters. Katoomba was present during the Japanese bombing of Darwin on 19 February, but was not significantly damaged.

At the end of June, Katoomba was reassigned as a convoy escort and anti-submarine patrol ship in the waters of northern Queensland and New Guinea. On 14 August, Katoomba was sent to assist United States submarine S-39, which had run aground on a reef off Rossel Island. Attempts to refloat the submarine were unsuccessful, and on 16 August, the corvette left Rossel Island with S-39’s entire crew of 47 embarked. The submarine was gutted and left to break up naturally. On 28 November, Katoomba and sister ship Ballarat were attacked by a force of ten Japanese dive bombers. The corvettes escaped without serious damage. Katoomba was attacked again during January 1943, when a force of six Japanese aircraft attacked the corvette and the Dutch merchant ship Van Heutz. Katoomba escaped serious damage, but the merchantman was hit, with one man killed and three injured.

In February 1944, Katoomba ended her escort duties, and after a short period on patrol, was sent to Sydney for refitting. Upon her return to New Guinea waters in early May 1944, the corvette was assigned as an anti-submarine patrol ship. She remained in this role until the start of March 1945, although during this period she was occasionally used as an escort ship. The corvette returned to Australian waters, spent three months in Fremantle, then was assigned to Darwin, where she operated until the end of World War II.

After the war's end, Katoomba was sent to the Japanese surrender at Timor, before assignment to mine-clearance duties throughout New Guinea waters. She returned to Sydney in October 1946, and was prepared for decommissioning, but was instead reactivated to help clear the coast of Queensland of mines.

Katoomba received three battle honours for her wartime service: "Darwin 1942", "Pacific 1942–45", and "New Guinea 1942–44".

Decommissioning and fate
Katoomba arrived in Fremantle on 16 January 1948, and was paid off into reserve on 2 August. She remained in reserve until 2 May 1957, when she was sold for breaking up as scrap to the Hong Kong Rolling Mills.

Citations

References
Books

Journal and news articles

External links

Bathurst-class corvettes of the Royal Australian Navy
Ships built in New South Wales
1941 ships
World War II corvettes of Australia